Isoetes olympica, the Olympic quillwort, is a flowering plant in the family Isoetaceae. The IUCN has classified the species as critically endangered. It was named by Alexander Braun in 1867.

Distribution
The species is native to Turkey and Syria.

References 

olympica
Flora of Western Asia
Taxa named by Alexander Braun